Pentimento is a 1989 French comedy film directed and written by Tonie Marshall. It was the debut of Marshall as director.

Synopsis 
Lucie (Patricia Dinev) finds out that her father,  whom she never knew, recently died. She reaches out how to go to his funeral and she rushes to the cemetery. She arrives at the ceremony and falls in love with a man that could be her brother. Lucie later discovers that she went to the wrong part of the graveyard and she was not related to anybody at the funeral.

Cast 

 Patricia Dinev
 Antoine de Caunes
 Magali Noël

References

External links 
 

1989 films
Films directed by Tonie Marshall
French comedy films
1980s French films